John Saunders may refer to:

Government
John Saunders (English judge) (born 1949), English High Court Judge of the Queen's Bench Division
John Saunders (MP) (1590–1638), English lawyer and politician, represented Reading in the House of Commons
John Saunders (New Brunswick judge) (1754–1834), Canadian soldier, lawyer, and Chief Justice of the colonial Province of New Brunswick
John R. Saunders (1869–1934), American lawyer and politician in Virginia

Sports
John Saunders (American football) (1950–2001), American football player
John Saunders (chess player) (born 1953), British chess player, writer and magazine editor
John Saunders (footballer) (1950–1998), English professional footballer
John Saunders (jockey), Epsom Derby winning jockey in the 19th century
John Saunders (cricketer), South African-born English cricketer and academic

Others
John Cunningham Saunders (1773–1810), British ophthalmologist
John P. Saunders, British police officer killed by the Indian revolutionaries Bhagat Singh and Shivaram Rajguru
John Monk Saunders (1897–1940), American novelist, screenwriter and movie director
John Saunders, pseudonym of the British Western fiction novelist Arthur Nickson (1902–1974)
John Joseph Saunders (1910–1972), British medieval historian
Jake Saunders or Sir John Saunders (1917–2002), chairman of the Hong Kong and Shanghai Banking Corporation
John Baker Saunders (1954–1999), founding member and bassist for the American group Mad Season
John Saunders (journalist) (1955–2016), Canadian-American sports journalist
John Llewellyn Saunders (1891–1961), New Zealand dentist and public health administrator
John W. Saunders Jr., American scientist
John Saunders (Home and Away), fictional character on the Australian soap opera Home and Away

See also
Jonathan Saunders (born 1977), Scottish fashion designer
Jonny Saunders (born 1975), British sports radio broadcaster
John Sanders (disambiguation)